William Richard Keating (born September 6, 1952) is an American lawyer and politician serving as the U.S. representative for Massachusetts's 9th congressional district since 2013. A member of the Democratic Party, he first entered Congress in 2011, representing Massachusetts's 10th congressional district until redistricting. Keating's district includes Cape Cod and most of the South Coast. He raised his profile advocating for criminal justice issues in both houses of the Massachusetts General Court from 1977 to 1999 before becoming district attorney of Norfolk County, where he served three terms before being elected to Congress.

Raised in Sharon, Massachusetts, Keating "took a traditional route to politics", attending Boston College and Suffolk University Law School. He was elected to the Massachusetts House of Representatives in 1976 at age 24 and went on to serve in the Massachusetts Senate from 1985 to 1999. He authored numerous bills signed into law concerning taxation, drug crime, and sentencing reform. His attempted overthrow of Senate President William M. Bulger in 1994 was a failure but boosted his local name recognition, which contributed to his success in the 1998 election for DA.

Keating followed the path of former Norfolk County District Attorney Bill Delahunt to the U.S. House of Representatives, winning election in 2010 to represent the 10th congressional district. In 2012, after redistricting drew his home in Quincy into the district of fellow incumbent Stephen Lynch, Keating chose to run in the redrawn 9th district, which combined the eastern portion of his old district with new territory on the South Coast taken from the 4th district long represented by Barney Frank. Keating has been reelected five times from this district. As of the 117th Congress (2021–23), he sits on the House Armed Services Committee and Foreign Affairs Committee. Much of his work has focused on domestic issues central to his district, such as the fishing industry and nuclear safety.

Early life, education, and legal career
Keating was born in Sharon, Massachusetts, in 1952 to Anna (née Welch) of Foxborough, Massachusetts, and William B. Keating of Sharon, Massachusetts. After graduating from Sharon High School, Keating enrolled at Boston College, from which he received his Bachelor of Arts in 1974, and his Master of Business Administration in 1982. In 1985, Keating earned his Juris Doctor from Suffolk University Law School and passed the bar exam. He later became a partner at the law firm of Keating & Fishman.

Massachusetts General Court

House of Representatives
In 1977, Keating was elected to the Massachusetts House of Representatives from the 19th Norfolk district, where he served for a year. He was then elected from the 8th Norfolk district, serving from 1979 to 1984. He supported George Keverian's successful 1985 effort to overthrow Thomas W. McGee as Speaker of the House. By the end of his House tenure, Keating became vice chairman of the House Criminal Justice Committee.

Senate

In 1984, State Senator Joseph F. Timilty resigned his Norfolk and Suffolk seat to pursue a career in private law, and Keating became the only major Democratic contender for the office. In the general election he faced Republican Marion Boch, who promoted a plan for dramatic cuts to legislators' pay and hours, invoking the energy of the Ronald Reagan campaign.

Keating focused his campaign on expanding resources for crime prevention and education, tailoring his message to the Boston constituency he would pick up as a senator. He was elected with about 64% of the vote.

In his first year, Keating was named Senate chairman of the joint Public Safety Committee, where he led the legislative action for a statewide seat belt law pushed by Governor Michael Dukakis. He authored a drug sentencing reform package signed into law in 1988, lowering thresholds for possession charges and establishing new minimum sentences, including a one-year minimum sentence for first-time possession of cocaine or PCP "with intent to distribute". The latter provision was widely derided by criminal justice authorities as excessively strict and vaguely worded.

Redistricting eventually placed Keating in the Norfolk and Bristol seat (1989–1994). As a vice chairman of the joint Criminal Justice Committee, he was a lead author of a 1991 sentencing reform bill, signed into law by Governor William Weld, that made it easier to try juveniles as adults and pass harsher sentences in the case of major crimes, especially murder. "What is occurring is a shift away from the rehabilitative stance to a focus on the seriousness of the crime committed by the juvenile", Keating said. In 1992, as co-chairman of the Taxation Committee, he successfully pushed a proposal to phase out the Massachusetts estate tax.

In 1994, Keating led a group of liberals in a failed coup to remove state Senate President William Bulger from his position. A staunch liberal compared to the more socially conservative Bulger, Keating sought to reform the Senate rules to greatly reduce the president's power. Bulger, who had held the Senate gavel for 15 years, exerted strict control over the body's operations, but was gradually losing his power base, with crops of Democratic freshmen replacing his longtime allies. Keating's campaign failed, but he said during his 2010 election campaign: "The thought that I took on the most powerful person in Massachusetts, risking my whole career, a member of my own party, is something that is resonating in this campaign, that helps define me as independent."

Further redistricting landed Keating in the Norfolk, Bristol, and Plymouth district from 1995 to 1998. During his Senate tenure, he served as chairman of the Judiciary Committee, chairman of the Committee on Taxation, chairman of the Committee on Public Safety, chairman of the Steering and Policy Committee, and vice chairman of the Committee on Criminal Justice.

District attorney
Speculation emerged in early 1997 that Keating was planning a run for district attorney (DA) of Norfolk County. He faced two former Norfolk assistant DAs, John J. Corrigan and William P. O'Donnell, in the Democratic primary. Keating, whose name recognition was boosted by the attempted Bulger coup, presented his work on public safety, criminal justice, and judiciary committees as a strength, while the other candidates pointed to his lack of courtroom experience as disqualifying. While Keating held a part-time law practice during his legislative career, he lacked exposure to the criminal cases handled by the DA's office.

After winning the Democratic nomination, Keating faced incumbent DA Jeffrey A. Locke in the November 1998 general election. A Republican, Locke had been appointed to the position by Governor Weld the previous year after Bill Delahunt resigned. With years of experience as a prosecutor, Locke portrayed Keating as a career politician and echoed his primary opponents' criticism of his experience. Keating highlighted a range of endorsements from police organizations, and from Delahunt, as evidence of his criminal justice qualifications. Aided by a Democratic-leaning electorate, Keating won the election with around 55% of the vote.

Upon taking office in January 1999, Keating immediately replaced two top officials, and a third of the remaining staff was replaced or left voluntarily. Press reports criticized the move as overly political and aggressive, particularly as it affected ongoing trials.

In his first year, Keating founded the Norfolk Anti-Crime Council, a 35-member forum for judicial officers, police, and other local parties to discuss and coordinate anti-crime strategies. He established a pilot program for a drug court under Quincy District Court, which would provide an alternative sentencing pathway for nonviolent drug offenders, in an effort to reduce court backlogs and lower recidivism rates. He also expanded his office's juvenile crime unit. In 2000, he laid the groundwork for the Norfolk Country Children's Advocacy Center, based on similar programs in Middlesex and Suffolk counties, and it was fully established the next year. Keating's office also began an anti-bullying program in 2001.

In 2002, Keating's office was the first in Massachusetts to win a murder conviction in a case that lacked a victim's body.

In advance of the 2002 elections, he was seen as a likely contender to succeed the deceased Joe Moakley in the U.S. House of Representatives, but he opted to run for a second term as DA instead, and was unopposed for reelection. He won a third term, still unopposed, in 2006.

U.S. House of Representatives

Elections
With incumbent U.S. Representative Bill Delahunt choosing to retire, Keating declared his candidacy in the 2010 congressional election. In order to run for Delahunt's 10th district seat, Keating moved from his longtime home in Sharon (in the neighboring 4th district) to a rental property in Quincy.

On September 14, Keating won the Democratic primary against State Senator Robert O'Leary. In the general election, he faced Republican State Representative Jeff Perry. In the wake of the Tea Party movement and the election of Republican U.S. Senator Scott Brown, the campaign was unusually close for a modern Massachusetts race, which would normally skew heavily Democratic. Keating's campaign largely focused on a 1991 incident during Perry's tenure as a police sergeant in which a teenage girl had been illegally strip-searched by another officer while Perry was on the scene. The Democratic Congressional Campaign Committee ran a widely aired advertisement highlighting the incident and challenging Perry's character. Keating won the November 2 election with 47% of the vote to Perry's 42%, with two independents receiving the remainder.

During his first term in the House, Keating represented a district that served much of the South Shore, part of the South Coast, and all of Cape Cod. With the state poised to lose a congressional seat after the 2010 census, lawmakers released a redistricting plan in November 2011 in which Keating's home in Quincy was drawn into the neighboring 8th district, represented by Stephen Lynch. Under the plan, nearly all of Keating's base in the South Shore was drawn into Lynch's South Boston-based district. Most of the southern portion of Keating's old district, including his summer home in Bourne on Cape Cod, was combined with territory centered on the South Coast cities of New Bedford and Fall River to create the new 9th district. Rather than challenge Lynch in the Democratic primary, Keating chose to run in the 9th, claiming his summer home as his residence in the district. Keating defeated Bristol County District Attorney Samuel Sutter in the September 6 Democratic primary, and in November 2012 defeated Republican nominee Christopher Sheldon to win a second term.

Tenure

Keating is considered a liberal by national standards. In 2012, the National Journal ranked him as "the 84th most liberal member of the House", but second only to Lynch as the most conservative of Massachusetts's House delegation.

In February 2017, the National Republican Congressional Committee named Keating as one of 36 top Democratic targets in the 2018 elections. Republicans hoped to gain seats in the election in blue-collar parts of the country.

Keating is a member of the New Democrat Coalition, the House Baltic Caucus, the Congressional Arts Caucus and the U.S.–Japan Caucus.

Economic issues and budget
Issues specific to his South Coast and Cape Cod–based district, such as maritime policy, have been a major focus of Keating's work. In June 2012, he organized the Federal Fishing Advisory Board, a body to research and address fisheries management concerns between lawmakers and industry stakeholders. Also in 2012, he and other Massachusetts representatives pushed the Commerce Department to issue a federal disaster declaration for fisheries in the northeastern U.S., which would open up the opportunity for financial aid. In the wake of Hurricane Sandy, Keating proposed to redirect $111 million of relief funding to fisheries throughout the country, but the House Rules Committee did not adopt the proposal.

When the Nuclear Regulatory Commission considered a 20-year contract extension for the Pilgrim Nuclear Generating Station in Plymouth in mid-2012, Keating repeatedly took to the press. He at first declined to take a position on the plant's reauthorization, saying, "I wouldn't be the right person to ask, and that's why we have regulatory authorities and people with expertise to deal with that." When the commission voted to renew the license, Keating joined other Massachusetts politicians in deriding the decision as premature.

During a labor strike later in the year, Keating joined U.S. Representative Ed Markey in challenging the qualifications of the plant's replacement workers.

Along with U.S. Senator John Kerry, Keating helped to finalize the cleanup and sale of portions of a defunct naval air base in South Weymouth to private developers. The deal, reached in November 2011, was a linchpin for the SouthField development project.

Keating has stressed his opposition to Social Security reductions such as raising the retirement age or privatizing the program, and supported a cost-of-living adjustment the Social Security Administration announced in 2011.

In 2011, Keating had a 100% rating from the American Federation of Labor and Congress of Industrial Organizations (AFL–CIO), backing all 29 endorsed bills. In 2012, Keating voted for 10 of 12 AFL-CIO backed bills, with the two opposing votes dealing with small business startups and swap dealer exclusions.

Overall, Keating has supported 95% of AFL-CIO-endorsed legislation. He has received an 0% rating from the anti-union WorkPlaceChoice.org. He voted against the NLRB Prohibitions Bill in November 2011.

Foreign affairs and defense
Keating sits on the House Foreign Affairs Committee, where he is the ranking member of the Europe, Eurasia and Emerging Threats Subcommittee, and formerly served on the House Homeland Security Committee. He joined a Congressional delegation to Afghanistan, Pakistan, and Iraq, shortly after the 2011 execution of Osama Bin Laden.

After TSA officers in Boston were accused of racial profiling in 2012, Keating requested a Homeland Security Committee hearing into the accusations.

Social issues
In 2011, Keating founded a Women's Advisory Board for the 10th congressional district, in hopes of gaining insight into how best to serve the women in the 10th district. From October 18 to 21, 2011, he hosted "Women's Week" in the district, with events focusing on topics such as breast cancer awareness, domestic violence, and female entrepreneurship.

Keating is pro-choice, and during his tenure in the House has voted against the Protect Life Act and the No Taxpayer Funding for Abortion Act.

In 2010, Keating received a rating of 0% from Massachusetts Citizens for Life. In 1997, he was rated 100% by NARAL Pro-Choice Massachusetts. The same year, he received a 100% rating from the Massachusetts National Organization for Women.

Keating is a supporter of gay rights. He supported ending the Don't Ask Don't Tell policy and has promised to push nationwide anti-discrimination laws and marriage rights for gays and lesbians. In July 2011, he recorded a video supporting LGBT youth in Massachusetts in conjunction with other members of Massachusetts's congressional delegation and the It Gets Better Project.

During his 2010 House campaign, Keating promised to increase federal firearm regulations. His proposed changes included closing a loophole that allows people on the FBI Terrorist Watch List to buy guns and requiring child safety trigger locks on all guns. He voted against a bill to require any state offering right-to-carry permits to recognize such permits issued in other states.

Legislation
Keating and Representative Aaron Schock jointly introduced the Equitable Access to Care and Health Act (H.R. 1814; 113th Congress) on April 29, 2013. The bill would amend the Internal Revenue Code with respect to minimum essential health care coverage requirements added by the Patient Protection and Affordable Care Act, to allow an additional religious exemption from such requirements for people whose sincerely held religious beliefs would cause them to object to medical health care provided under such coverage. Individuals could file an affidavit to get this exemption, but would lose the exemption if they went on to later use healthcare. Schock and Keating wrote a letter in support of their bill, saying, "we believe the EACH Act balances a respect for religious diversity against the need to prevent fraud and abuse."

Committee assignments  

 Committee on Armed Services
 Subcommittee on Strategic Forces and Intelligence
 Subcommittee on Emerging Threats and Capabilities
  Committee on Foreign Affairs
 Subcommittee on Europe, Eurasia, Energy, and Environment (Chair)
 Subcommittee on Middle East, North Africa, and International Terrorism

Caucus memberships
New Democrat Coalition

Personal life
Keating and his wife, Tevis, live in Bourne, Massachusetts. They have two adult children. He is Roman Catholic.

References

External links

 Congressman Bill Keating official U.S. House website
 Bill Keating for Congress
 

 

|-

|-

|-

|-

|-

|-

|-

|-

1952 births
21st-century American politicians
American Roman Catholics
American prosecutors
Boston College alumni
Catholics from Massachusetts
Democratic Party members of the United States House of Representatives from Massachusetts
District attorneys in Norfolk County, Massachusetts
Living people
Massachusetts lawyers
Democratic Party Massachusetts state senators
Democratic Party members of the Massachusetts House of Representatives
People from Bourne, Massachusetts
People from Norwood, Massachusetts
Suffolk University Law School alumni